Whisman is a light rail station operated by Santa Clara Valley Transportation Authority (VTA), located in Mountain View, California. This station is served by the Orange Line of the VTA Light Rail system.

The station is surrounded by a residential area built as transit-oriented development. There is no connecting bus transit at this station.

Service

Station layout

References

External links 

VTA – Whisman station

Santa Clara Valley Transportation Authority light rail stations
Railway stations in Mountain View, California
Railway stations in the United States opened in 1999
1999 establishments in California